Pigna Barney River, a partly perennial river of the Manning River catchment, is located in the Upper Hunter district of New South Wales, Australia.

Course and features
Pigna Barney River rises on the eastern slopes of Mount Royal Range, south of the locale of Glenrock, and flows generally east by south before reaching its confluence with the Manning River, south of Mount Myra. The river descends  over its  course.

See also 

 Rivers of New South Wales
 List of rivers of New South Wales (L–Z)
 List of rivers of Australia

References

External links
 

Rivers of New South Wales
Rivers of the Hunter Region
Upper Hunter Shire